Gilia stellata is a species of flowering plant in the phlox family known by the common name star gilia. It is native to the southwestern United States and northern Mexico, where it is a common resident of desert washes and sandy mountain slopes.

Description
The erect, branching stem reaches a maximum height around 40 centimeters and is coated in stiff, white hairs and stalked glands. Leaves are mostly arranged in a basal rosette at the ground, each leaf composed of toothlike leaflets.

The inflorescence is an array of several small funnel-shaped flowers. Each flower has a corolla of five pointed lobes in shades of light pink or lavender and a yellowish throat.

External links
Jepson Manual Treatment - Gilia stellata
Gilia stellata - Photo gallery

stellata
Flora of Nevada
Flora of Arizona
Flora of New Mexico
Flora of the California desert regions
Flora of the Sonoran Deserts
Flora without expected TNC conservation status